Tolland is a suburb located in the city of Wagga Wagga in the Riverina region of New South Wales, Australia. The suburb is home to Mount Austin High School and Tolland Shopping Centre which has an IGA supermarket and a Domino's Pizza outlet. 

It was also home to the South Wagga / Tolland Football Club that played in the Farrer Football League from 1982 to 1997. The club disbanded in 1998.

References

External links 

Suburbs of Wagga Wagga